Evil Beaver is an American bass and drum avant-garde punk band from Chicago. The band performed their final show at the Roxy Theatre in West Hollywood, CA in July 2015. 

The band's only members, Evie Evil (bass and vocals) and Sammy Kickass (drums), met in the 3rd grade at Sieden Prairie Elementary School and started playing together in 1999.

Evil Beaver toured and performed shows with a diversity of musical artist which included Nina Hagen, Jucifer, David J, Brick Layer Cake, The Muffs, Agent Orange, Chevelle, Fu Manchu, Peaches, Polysics, The Vibrators, Semi Precious Weapons, Shellac, Local H, UK Subs, Girl In A Coma, Murphy’s Law, Betty Blowtorch, The Gossip and The White Stripes. 

The band was known for rigorous tour schedules, performing on four different continents in 1 year, including a 10 show stint in Russia during the Sochi Olympics of which they survived a tragic tour bus accident during a snow blizzard that resulted in a broken wrist for singer/bassist Evie Evil.  

Evil Beaver has released music on Johann's Face Records and Four Alarm Records.

History
Evil Beaver was founded in 1999 in Chicago’s Wicker Park neighborhood by band leader Evie Evil. Evie is the sole songwriter for the band and featured on electric lead bass guitar and vocals, Samuel Golf (Slammin' Sammy Kickass), plays drums. Evie and Sammy began their friendship in the 3rd grade as classmates and playmates at Sieden Prairie Elementary School near Chicago, IL.

The group's debut, Smells Like Christmas Spirit was released in December 1999. Followed by a split LP with The Traitors in 2001, Evil Beaver released their debut LP, Lick It! on Four Alarm Records. Since then, three full-length records have been released: Pleased to Eat You (2003), In The Spirit of Resilient Optimism (2007), and Live in the Studio (2014). In 2006 the band released an EP titled Models of Virtue featuring drummer Gene Trautmann of Queens of the Stone Age and Eagles of Death Metal. The two were rumored to have been romantically involved during the production of the EP but separated shortly after its release.

In 2008 the band contributed a cover of Elvis's "Blue Christmas" for a compilation titled, Merry Xmas Dammit From the Double Down Saloon.

Discography

All released music

References

Punk rock groups from Illinois
Musical groups from Chicago
Musical groups established in 1999
American musical duos
1999 establishments in Illinois